Limonium melitense is a species of plants in the family Plumbaginaceae (leadworts).

Sources

References 

Endemic flora of Malta
melitense
Taxa named by Salvatore Brullo
Flora of Malta